Borgheim is the administrative centre of the municipality of Færder in Vestfold, Norway.
The village is located in the middle of the island of Nøtterøy. Before 2018, Borgheim was the administrative centre of the municipality of Nøtterøy before Nøtterøy and Tjøme where combined into  the municipality of Færder.

References

Villages in Vestfold og Telemark
Færder